Carters Dam is an earthen embankment dam located south of Chatsworth in Murray County and west of Ellijay in northwestern Georgia, United States, that creates Carters Lake.

Description

The dam is constructed of rock and earth and is the tallest earthen dam east of the Mississippi River. 

The lake is the deepest manmade reservoir east of the Mississippi River and deepest lake in Georgia.

Hydroelectric plant
Below the dam is a  retention and re-regulation lake (Reregulation Reservoir). The hydroelectric plant is of the pumped storage type. That is, during off-peak hours the water from the retention lake is pumped back up to Carters Lake for use in generating power during the next time of peak demand. The dam's power station contains 2 ×  Francis turbines and 2 × 160 MW Modified Francis pump turbines for used in pumped-storage.

See also 

 List of dams and reservoirs in Georgia (U.S. state)
 List of power plants in Georgia
 Sixtoe Mound
 Pumped-storage hydroelectricity
 List of energy storage projects
 List of pumped-storage hydroelectric power stations
 United States Department of Energy Global Energy Storage Database

References

 U.S. Army Corps of Engineers: Pertinent data on Carters Dam and Lake

External links
 Georgia Trails: Carters Lake
 U.S. Army Corps of Engineers: Carters Lake
 U.S. Army Corps of Engineers: Carters Lake

Dams in Georgia (U.S. state)
Buildings and structures in Murray County, Georgia
United States Army Corps of Engineers dams
Dams completed in 1977
ACT River Basin
1977 establishments in Georgia (U.S. state)
Pumped-storage hydroelectric power stations in the United States